General elections were held in Monaco on 1 February 1998, with a second round of voting on 8 February. The result was a victory for the National and Democratic Union, which won all 18 seats in the National Council.

Results

By party

First round

Second round

References

Elections in Monaco
Monaco
1998 in Monaco
Monaco